Lectionary 48, designated by siglum ℓ 48 (in the Gregory-Aland numbering). It is a Greek manuscript of the New Testament, on parchment leaves. Dated by a colophon it has been assigned to the year 1055.

Description 

The codex contains lessons from the Gospels of John, Matthew, Luke lectionary (Evangelistarium), on 250 parchment leaves. The text is written in two columns per page, in 24 lines per page, in Greek minuscule letters. Full of errors of itacism, it contains musical notes. 

In Mark 10:7 omitted phrase και προσκολληθησεται προς την γυναικα αυτου (and be joined to his wife), as in codices Codex Sinaiticus, Vaticanus, Athous Lavrensis, 892, syrs, goth.

History 

The manuscript was written by Peter, monk. In 1312 it belonged to Nicephorus, Metropolitan of Crete. It was held in the monastery Iviron in Athos peninsula. 

The manuscript was examined by Matthaei. 

The manuscript is not cited in the critical editions of the Greek New Testament (UBS3).

Currently the codex is located in the State Historical Museum, (V. 11 S. 42) in Moscow.

See also 

 List of New Testament lectionaries
 Biblical manuscript
 Textual criticism

Notes and references 

Greek New Testament lectionaries
11th-century biblical manuscripts